The 1952 Oregon State Beavers baseball team represented Oregon State College in the 1952 NCAA baseball season. The Beavers played their home games at Coleman Field. The team was coached by Ralph Coleman in his 21st year at Oregon State.

The Beavers won the District VIII playoff to advanced to the College World Series, where they were defeated by the Texas Longhorns.

Roster

Schedule 

! style="" | Regular Season
|- valign="top" 

|- align="center" bgcolor="#ccffcc"
| 1 ||  ||  || Coleman Field • Corvallis, Oregon || 22–5 || 1–0 || –
|- align="center" bgcolor="#ccffcc"
| 2 ||  ||  || Coleman Field • Corvallis, Oregon || 5–0 || 2–0 || –
|- align="center" bgcolor="#ccffcc"
| 3 ||  || Linfield || Coleman Field • Corvallis, Oregon || 6–0 || 3–0 || –
|- align="center" bgcolor="#ccffcc"
| 4 ||  ||  || Coleman Field • Corvallis, Oregon || 16–3 || 4–0 || –
|- align="center" bgcolor="#ccffcc"
| 5 ||  ||  || Coleman Field • Corvallis, Oregon || 8–4 || 5–0 || –
|- align="center" bgcolor="#ccffcc"
| 6 ||  || at  || Howe Field • Eugene, Oregon || 4–1 || 6–0 || 1–0
|- align="center" bgcolor="#ccffcc"
| 7 ||  ||  || Coleman Field • Corvallis, Oregon || 4–2 || 7–0 || 1–0
|- align="center" bgcolor="#ffcccc"
| 8 ||  || Lewis & Clark || Coleman Field • Corvallis, Oregon || 2–3 || 7–1 || 1–0
|- align="center" bgcolor="#ccffcc"
| 9 ||  ||  || Coleman Field • Corvallis, Oregon || 5–3 || 8–1 || 1–0
|- align="center" bgcolor="#ccffcc"
| 10 ||  || at Pacific (OR) || Unknown • Newburg, Oregon || 16–4 || 9–1 || 1–0
|- align="center" bgcolor="#ffcccc"
| 11 ||  || at Linfield || Unknown • McMinnville, Oregon || 4–5 || 9–2 || 1–0
|- align="center" bgcolor="#ffcccc"
| 12 ||  || Oregon || Coleman Field • Corvallis, Oregon || 5–12 || 9–3 || 1–1
|- align="center" bgcolor="#ccffcc"
| 13 ||  || at Lewis & Clark || Harris Field • Lewiston, Idaho || 10–4 || 10–3 || 1–1
|- align="center" bgcolor="#ccffcc"
| 14 ||  || Linfield || Coleman Field • Corvallis, Oregon || 5–1 || 11–3 || 1–1
|- align="center" bgcolor="#ccffcc"
| 15 ||  || Linfield || Coleman Field • Corvallis, Oregon || 22–5 || 12–3 || 1–1
|- align="center" bgcolor="#ccffcc"
| 16 ||  ||  || Coleman Field • Corvallis, Oregon || 9–2 || 13–3 || 2–1
|- align="center" bgcolor="#ffcccc"
| 17 ||  || Washington State || Coleman Field • Corvallis, Oregon || 3–9 || 13–4 || 2–2
|- align="center" bgcolor="#ccffcc"
| 18 ||  || at Portland || Unknown • Portland, Oregon || 19–8 || 14–4 || 2–2
|- align="center" bgcolor="#ffcccc"
| 19 ||  ||  || Coleman Field • Corvallis, Oregon || 15–16 || 14–5 || 2–3
|- align="center" bgcolor="#ccffcc"
| 20 ||  || Idaho || Coleman Field • Corvallis, Oregon || 7–4 || 15–5 || 3–3
|- align="center" bgcolor="#ccffcc"
| 21 ||  ||  || Coleman Field • Corvallis, Oregon || 7–1 || 16–5 || 4–3
|- align="center" bgcolor="#ccffcc"
| 22 ||  || Washington || Coleman Field • Corvallis, Oregon || 10–8 || 17–5 || 5–3
|- align="center" bgcolor="#ccffcc"
| 23 ||  || at Idaho || MacLean Field • Moscow, Idaho || 16–5 || 18–5 || 6–3
|- align="center" bgcolor="#ccffcc"
| 24 ||  || at Idaho || MacLean Field • Moscow, Idaho || 3–1 || 19–5 || 7–3
|- align="center" bgcolor="#ffcccc"
| 25 ||  || at Washington State || Bailey Field • Pullman, Washington || 3–5 || 19–6 || 7–4
|- align="center" bgcolor="#ccffcc"
| 26 ||  || at Washington State || Bailey Field • Pullman, Washington || 6–5 || 20–6 || 8–4
|- align="center" bgcolor="#ccffcc"
| 27 ||  || at Washington || Old Graves Field • Seattle, Washington || 6–2 || 21–6 || 9–4
|- align="center" bgcolor="#ffcccc"
| 28 ||  || at Washington || Old Graves Field • Seattle, Washington || 6–10 || 21–7 || 9–5
|- align="center" bgcolor="#ffcccc"
| 29 ||  ||  || Coleman Field • Corvallis, Oregon || 6–8 || 21–8 || 9–5
|- align="center" bgcolor="#ccffcc"
| 30 ||  || Oregon || Coleman Field • Corvallis, Oregon || 3–1 || 22–8 || 10–5
|- align="center" bgcolor="#ffcccc"
| 31 ||  || at Oregon || Howe Field • Eugene, Oregon || 13–14 || 22–9 || 10–6
|- align="center" bgcolor="#ccffcc"
| 32 ||  || Oregon || Coleman Field • Corvallis, Oregon || 7–6 || 23–9 || 10–6
|- align="center" bgcolor="#ffcccc"
| 33 ||  || at Oregon || Howe Field • Eugene, Oregon || 5–18 || 23–10 || 10–6
|-

|-
|-
! style="" | Postseason
|- valign="top"

|- align="center" bgcolor="#ccffcc"
| 34 || May 30 ||  || Coleman Field • Corvallis, Oregon || 12–10 || 24–10 || 10–6
|- align="center" bgcolor="#ccffcc"
| 35 || May 31 || Southern California || Coleman Field • Corvallis, Oregon || 5–4 || 25–10 || 10–6
|-

|- align="center" bgcolor="#ccffcc"
| 36 || June 6 ||  || Coleman Field • Corvallis, Oregon || 2–1 || 26–10 || 10–6
|- align="center" bgcolor="#ffcccc"
| 37 || June 7 || Fresno State || Coleman Field • Corvallis, Oregon || 8–4 || 27–10 || 10–6
|-

|- align="center" bgcolor="#ffcccc"
| 38 || June 12 || vs Duke || Omaha Municipal Stadium • Omaha, Nebraska || 7–18 || 27–11 || 10–6
|- align="center" bgcolor="#ffcccc"
| 39 || June 13 || vs Texas || Omaha Municipal Stadium • Omaha, Nebraska || 0–3 || 27–12 || 10–6
|-

Awards and honors 
Bailey Brem
 All-Northern Division Team
 First Team All-Western Regional

Chuck Fisk
 All-Northern Division Team
 Second Team All-Western Regional

Pete Goodbred
 All-Northern Division Team

Dwane Helbig
 All-Northern Division Team
 First Team All-Western Regional

Danny Johnston
 All-Northern Division Team

References 

Oregon State Beavers baseball seasons
Oregon State Beavers baseball
College World Series seasons
Oregon State
Pac-12 Conference baseball champion seasons